The Fœderatio Internationalis Una Voce or simply Una Voce (Latin for "With One Voice"; from the preface to the Roman Canon) is an international federation of Catholic lay organizations attached to the Tridentine Mass.

History
The Foederatio Internationalis Una Voce (or FIUV) was founded on December 19, 1964 in Paris by Georges Cerbelaud-Salagnac in order to promote the Tridentine Mass from the Pre-Vatican II Missale Romanum (1962). The organization argues that while the Second Vatican Council had introduced vernacular liturgies, it did not actually forbid the Latin Mass, and that regular weekday and Sunday Masses in Latin should be maintained. The organization also seeks to promote Latin Gregorian Chant, sacred polyphony and sacred art. Unlike some of the other Catholic traditionalist organizations, Una Voce seeks to remain faithful to the Pope within the Catholic Church, and asserts that the Tridentine and the vernacular masses should be allowed to co-exist. Among its prominent early members were the composers Maurice Duruflé and Olivier Messiaen.

A number of national associations developed during 1964 and 1965, and in 1966 an international association, the Foederatio Internationalis Una Voce was formed. It currently has over two dozen national affiliates.

FIUV members value the traditional Latin Mass as direct link with the early Church and for conveying the mystery and majesty of God, but have been critiqued for elitism and for its emphasis on private religious devotion. The group has been described as an "arch-conservative" organization by Episcopal Church organist James E Frazier. However, members of the FIUV reject comparisons to fundamentalism.

FIUV was enthusiastic about the election of Joseph Cardinal Ratzinger as the Pope in 2005. He took the name of Benedict XVI. He had spoken at a conference, and had praised FIUV's role in supporting the use of the Roman Missal within the guidelines set out by the Vatican.  The organization's influence at the highest levels of the Vatican has led to the authorization of the Tridentine Mass without specific permission or indult by local bishops, and the wider implementation of the motu proprio, Summorum Pontificum.

Membership
The International Federation represents 42 member associations in Argentina, Australia, Austria, Belarus, Belgium, Brazil, Canada, Chile, Costa Rica, Colombia, Croatia, Cuba, Czech Republic, England and Wales, Estonia, Finland, France, Germany, India, Ireland, Italy, Japan, Latvia, Malta, Mexico, the Netherlands, New Zealand, Nigeria, Norway, Peru, the Philippines, Poland, Portugal, Puerto Rico, Russia, Scotland, Singapore, South Africa, Spain, Switzerland, Taiwan, Ukraine and the USA. Since 2010, the International Federation has made remarkable progress. Requests for information and assistance have come from Denmark, Honduras, Hungary, Indonesia, Kenya, Korea, Lithuania, Luxembourg, Panama, Sarawak (Malaysian Borneo) and Slovenia.

Council
At the XXII General Assembly, held in Rome the 25 October 2015, the Council was elected and constituted as follows:
 President: Don Felipe Alanís Suárez (Una Voce Mexico)
 Vice President: M. Patrick Banken (Una Voce France)
 Secretary: Don Juan Manuel Rodríguez González-Cordero (Una Voce Sevilla, Spain)
 Treasurer: F. Monika Rheinschmitt  (Pro Missa Tridentina, Germany)
 M. Alain Cassagnau – Una Voce France 
 Don Albert Edward Doskey – Una Voce Cuba 
 Don Eduardo Colón – Una Voce Puerto Rico 
 Sr. Fabio Marino – Una Voce Italia 
 Mr. Hajime Kato – Una Voce Japan 
 Hr. Johann von Behr – Una Voce Germany 
 Dr. the Hon Joseph Shaw – Latin Mass Society of England and Wales 
 Mr. Marcin Gola – Una Voce Poland 
 Mr. Oleg-Michael Martynov – Una Voce Russia 
 Sgr. Othon de Medeiros Alves – Una Voce Natal, Brazil 
 Don Rodolfo Vargas Rubio – Roma Æterna, Barcelona (Spain)

See also
 Preconciliar rites after the Second Vatican Council
 Traditionalist Catholicism

References

External links
 International Federation Una Voce

Tridentine Mass
Ecclesia Dei
Traditionalist Catholicism
Catholic advocacy groups